Iyakkam is a 2008 Tamil language action film produced, written and directed by Sanjay Ram. The film stars newcomer Rishi Kumar, Shruthi Raj and Sujibala, with Sanjay Ram, Sudhakar Vasanth, R. Sundarrajan, Chitti Babu, M. S. Bhaskar and Poovilangu Mohan playing supporting roles. It was released on 25 April 2008.

Plot

In Chennai, two high-profile figures are killed and the police commissioner Muthu Kali takes charge of the case. From here, the film is narrated in a non-linear plot.

Nallathambi moves in a slum in Chennai and poses as an orphan. He then meets the soft-spoken Sarasu and saved her from a local don who harassed her to marry him, Sarasu falls in love with Nallathambi. Nallathambi then shoots dead an advocate in his office. During his escape, Muthu Kali shoots Nallathambi in the leg and his prosthetic leg fell off. Muthu Kali finds out that three victims grew up in an orphanage, a team were behind the murders and the last murderer had lost his leg recently. Sarasu gets the approval of her family to marry Nallathambi. In the meantime, Nallathambi befriends with Muthu Kali's wife Seetha, he invited her and her husband to attend his wedding. The day of the wedding, Nallathambi has disappeared and the wedding is cancelled. Meanwhile, Muthu Kali and his wife arrive at a remote place, and Nallathambi shoots Muthu Kali dead from a hidden place and flees the crime scene. Later, Nallathambi meets Sarasu and tells her everything.

In the past, Nallathambi real name was Meyyan, he was a district collector and lived with his uncle Muthukutty. He was deeply in love with his neighbour Malar and they eventually got married. Aandavar was an influential person who was involved in humanitarian activities and strongly believed in astrology. He ran an orphanage for his self-interest and he ordered the day and time of delivery of each baby to match his manufactured horoscope favourable to him. Using the caesarian procedure in the belief that bringing up such babies in his home would prolong his life. Nallathambi learned Aandavar killed the previous district collector. He then met Chinna Marudhu, a leader of a militant organization who fought against injustice, and he told Nallathambi about Aandavar's illegal activities and the next day, Nallathambi had the police arrest Aandavar. Nallathambi discovered that he was born in Aandavar's orphanage and his mother died during the delivery because the doctors forced her to delay it, Nallathambi then became a district collector due to Aandavar's financial help. A vengeful Aandavar set fire to Nallathambi's house and his family members perished. To take revenge on Aandavar, Nallathambi resigned his post as a collector and joined Chinna Marudhu's organization.

Back to the present, Nallathambi pleads Sarasu to forget him. The Chief Minister under Aandavar's influence has given free rein to the police to dismantle Chinna Marudhu's organization and they bring Chinna Marudhu alive to Aandavar's house. Aandavar requests Chinna Marudhu to join him and to kill Nallathambi or he will kill all the members of his organization. Nallathambi decides to sacrifice his life for the organization and Chinna Marudhu shot him dead. One year later, Chinna Marudhu works for Aandavar and he is waiting for the right moment to kill Aandavar.

Cast

Rishi Kumar as Nallathambi / Meyyan
Shruthi Raj as Sarasu
Sujibala as Malar
Sanjay Ram as Chinna Marudhu
Sudhakar Vasanth as Aandavar
R. Sundarrajan as Punniyakodi
Chitti Babu as Appusamy
M. S. Bhaskar as Muthukutty
Poovilangu Mohan as an astrologer
Omakuchi Narasimhan
Nellai Siva
Scissor Manohar
Bonda Mani
Chaplin Balu
Pandu
Risha in a special appearance

Production

After directing films like Thoothukudi (2006), Aadu Puli Attam (2006) and Veeramum Eeramum (2007), Sanjay Ram commenced his next directorial venture Iyakkam featuring newcomers under his own banner Lingam Theatres. Rishi Kumar, a former Tamil Nadu league cricket player, signed to play the role of a slum dweller as well as a district collector. He had also done a brief stint at the Koothu-P-Pattarai theatre. Sanjay Ram, a onetime associate of director Vincent Selva, said, "I am a great fan of Bollywood filmmaker Ram Gopal Varma. I am impressed with his style of filmmaking. I want to emulate him". He also added, "Quality is my motto. I want to give a quality entertainer for Tamil film-buffs".

Soundtrack

The film score and the soundtrack were composed by Pravin Mani. The soundtrack features 6 tracks with lyrics written by Ilaya Kamban. The audio was launched on 30 March 2008 by actors Shaam and Suriya in Chennai.

Reception

S. R. Ashok Kumar of The Hindu criticized the comedy segment but praised the artists' performance and the cinematography and added, "weak screenplay dilutes the concept". Another reviewer rated the film 2 out of 5 and wrote, "Director Sanjai Ram has put in his best efforts and the film would pass muster".

References

2008 films
2000s Tamil-language films
Indian action films
Indian vigilante films
Indian nonlinear narrative films
Films directed by Sanjay Ram
2008 action films
2000s vigilante films